Alharod (also Romanized as Eleherd, Alhard, and Elehred; also known as Alard, Alert, Alīrd, Alīrī, and Alirt) is a village in Sina Rural District, in the Central District of Varzaqan County, East Azerbaijan Province, Iran. At the 2006 census, its population was 121, in 24 families.

References 

Towns and villages in Varzaqan County